This is the discography of Arlo Guthrie.

Studio albums

Compilation albums

Live albums

Singles

References

Discographies of American artists
Arlo Guthrie songs